Gaspare Torretta (27 January 1879 – 14 February 1949) was an Italian athlete who competed in the 1906 Summer Olympics and  in the 1908 Summer Olympics.

Biography
In 1906, Torretta finished 17th in the long jump event. He also participated in the 100 metres competition but was eliminated in the semi-finals. Two years later in the 100 metres event, Torretta took second place in his first round heat with a time of 12.0 seconds. He did not advance to the semifinals. Torretta died in Milan.

Achievements

See also
 Men's high jump Italian record progression
 Italy at the 1908 Summer Olympics

Notes

References

External links
 

1879 births
1949 deaths
Athletes from Milan
Italian male sprinters
Italian male long jumpers
Olympic athletes of Italy
Athletes (track and field) at the 1906 Intercalated Games
Athletes (track and field) at the 1908 Summer Olympics